Tracy Baskin (born November 3, 1965) is an American middle-distance runner. He competed in the men's 800 metres at the 1988 Summer Olympics.

References

External links
 

1965 births
Living people
Athletes (track and field) at the 1988 Summer Olympics
American male middle-distance runners
Olympic track and field athletes of the United States
Place of birth missing (living people)
20th-century American people